Ezaria Ilkhanoff (Persian: ایزاریا ایلخانوف, born July 3, 1934 Moscow) also known as Ezrael Illkhanouf, was an Assyrian  boxer  who became a member of Iran senior national Boxing team in 1955, and also a member of Tehran Taj Club, boxing in the 51 kg division. He participated as a member of the Iranian boxers at the 1958 Asian Games, in the Flyweight division, and also at the 1960 Summer Olympics, in the Flyweight division, and was also selected for the Flyweight division of the Iranian national boxing team, to participate in the 1962 Asian Games.
In Tokyo 1958, Ilkhanoff won the bronze medal of the 51 kg boxing division, after losing on points to  Hla Nyunt from Burma, in the semifinal.

References

Living people
1934 births
Sportspeople from Moscow
Olympic boxers of Iran
Boxers at the 1960 Summer Olympics
Asian Games medalists in boxing
Boxers at the 1958 Asian Games
Asian Games bronze medalists for Iran
Iranian male boxers

Medalists at the 1958 Asian Games
Flyweight boxers
20th-century Iranian people